In the Ottoman Empire, amira was a small group of elite, wealthy Ottoman Armenians living in urban centers.

References

Armenians from the Ottoman Empire